Lawrence David Guth (born 1977) is a professor of mathematics at the Massachusetts Institute of Technology.

Education and career

Guth graduated from Yale in 2000, with BS in mathematics.

In 2005, he got his PhD in mathematics from the Massachusetts Institute of Technology, where he studied geometry of objects with random shapes under the supervision of Tomasz Mrowka.

After MIT, Guth went to Stanford as a postdoc, and later to the University of Toronto as an Assistant Professor.

In 2011, New York University's Courant Institute of Mathematical Sciences hired Guth as a professor, listing his areas of interest as "metric geometry, harmonic analysis, and geometric combinatorics."

In 2012, Guth moved to MIT, where he is Claude Shannon Professor of Mathematics.

Research
In his research, Guth has strengthened Gromov's systolic inequality for essential manifolds and, along with Nets Katz, found a solution to the Erdős distinct distances problem. His wide-ranging interests include the Kakeya conjecture and the systolic inequality.

Recognition

Guth won an Alfred P. Sloan Fellowship in 2010. He was an invited speaker at the International Congress of Mathematicians in India in 2010, where he spoke about systolic geometry.

In 2013, the American Mathematical Society awarded Guth its annual Salem Prize, citing his "major contributions to geometry and combinatorics."

In 2014 he received a Simons Investigator Award.
In 2015, he received the Clay Research Award.

He was included in the 2019 class of fellows of the American Mathematical Society "for contributions to harmonic analysis, combinatorics and geometry, and for exposition of high level mathematics".

On February 20, 2020, the National Academy of Sciences announced that Guth is the first winner of their new $20,000 Maryam Mirzakhani Prize in Mathematics for mid-career mathematicians. The citation states that his award is "for developing surprising, original, and deep connections between geometry, analysis, topology, and combinatorics, which have led to the solution of, or major advances on, many outstanding problems in these fields." In 2021, he was elected member of the US National Academy of Sciences.

Personal
He is the son of Alan Guth, a physicist known for the theory of inflation in cosmology.

Work
Metaphors in systolic geometry: the video
.
.
.
.
.
.
.

References

Living people
20th-century American mathematicians
Massachusetts Institute of Technology School of Science alumni
Academic staff of the University of Toronto
Geometers
Courant Institute of Mathematical Sciences faculty
1977 births
Simons Investigator
Place of birth missing (living people)
Fellows of the American Mathematical Society
Yale College alumni
21st-century American mathematicians
Members of the United States National Academy of Sciences